Cyperus steudneri is a species of sedge that is native to parts of Africa.

See also 
 List of Cyperus species

References 

steudneri
Plants described in 2013
Flora of Ethiopia
Flora of Eritrea
Flora of Chad
Flora of Kenya
Flora of Sudan
Flora of Tanzania
Flora of Zambia
Flora of Zimbabwe